The 2001 All-Ireland Senior Camogie Championship Final was the seventieth All-Ireland Final and the deciding match of the 2001 All-Ireland Senior Camogie Championship, an inter-county camogie tournament for the top teams in Ireland.

Tipperary had the wind in the first half, and ran up an eleven-point lead by half-time. Deirdre Hughes was top scorer with 2-2.

References

All-Ireland Senior Camogie Championship Finals
All-Ireland Senior Camogie Championship Final
All-Ireland Senior Camogie Championship Final
All-Ireland Senior Camogie Championship Final, 2001